Trevanion is an English surname. Notable people with the surname include:

Charles Trevanion, 17th century English politician
Christina Trevanion (born 1981), British auctioneer and television personality
John Trevanion (disambiguation), multiple people

English-language surnames